The Standard Performance Evaluation Corporation (SPEC) is an American non-profit corporation that aims to "produce, establish, maintain and endorse a standardized set" of performance benchmarks for computers.

SPEC was founded in 1988. SPEC benchmarks are widely used to evaluate the performance of computer systems; the test results are published on the SPEC website.

SPEC evolved into an umbrella organization encompassing four diverse groups; Graphics and Workstation Performance Group (GWPG), the High Performance Group (HPG), the Open Systems Group (OSG) and the newest, the Research Group (RG).

Structure 

 The Open Systems Group (OSG)
 The High-Performance Group (HPG)
 The Graphics and Workstation Performance Group (GWPG)
 SPEC Research Group (RG)

Membership

Membership in SPEC is open to any interested company or entity that is willing to commit to SPEC's standards. It allows:

 Participation in benchmark development
 Participation in review of results
 Complimentary software based on group participation

The list of members is available on SPEC's membership page;.

Membership Levels

 Sustaining Membership requires dues payment and typically includes hardware or software companies.
 SPEC "Associates" pay a reduced fee as nonprofits; typically includes academia and research organizations.

SPEC Benchmark Suites

The benchmarks aim to test "real-life" situations. There are several benchmarks testing Java scenarios, from simple computation (SPECjbb) to a full system with Java EE, database, disk, and network (SPECjEnterprise).

The SPEC CPU suites test CPU performance by measuring the run time of several programs such as the compiler GCC, the chemistry program gamess, and the weather program WRF.  The various tasks are equally weighted; no attempt is made to weight them based on their perceived importance.  An overall score is based on a geometric mean.

Cloud
Measuring and comparing the provisioning, compute, storage, and network resources of IaaS cloud platforms.

 SPEC Cloud IaaS 2018
 SPEC Cloud IaaS 2016

CPU 

Measuring and comparing combined performance of CPU, memory and compiler.

 SPEC CPU2006 contains two suites:
 CINT2006 ("SPECint") - testing integer arithmetic, with programs such as compilers, interpreters, word processors, chess programs etc.
 CFP2006 ("SPECfp") - testing floating point performance, with physical simulations, 3D graphics, image processing, computational chemistry etc.
 SPEC CPU 2017 package contains four suites.
 The SPECspeed 2017 Integer and SPECspeed 2017 Floating Point suites are used for comparing time for a computer to complete single tasks.
 The SPECrate 2017 Integer and SPECrate 2017 Floating Point suites measure the throughput or work per unit of time.

Handheld

Graphics and Workstation Performance 
Measuring performance of an OpenGL 3D graphics system, tested with various rendering tasks from several popular 3D-intensive real applications on a given system.

SPECwpc

High Performance Computing, OpenMP, MPI, OpenACC, OpenCL

OMP 
The SPEC OMP (OpenMP) is the first one for evaluating performance based on OpenMP applications, for measuring the performance of SMP (Shared memory Multi-Processor, i.e. UMA) systems.

Java Client/Server

JBB 
evaluates the performance of server side Java by emulating a three-tier client/server system (with emphasis on the middle tier).

j Enterprise 
A multi-tier benchmark for measuring the performance of Java 2 Enterprise Edition (J2EE) technology-based application servers.

Mail Servers

Storage 

SPEC SFS is for measuring file server throughput and response time supporting both NFS and SMB protocol access.

Power

Virtualization

Web Servers

SPEC Tools

 Server Efficiency Rating Tool (SERT). Intended to measure server efficiency, initially as part of the second generation of the US Environmental Protection Agency (EPA) ENERGY STAR for Computer Servers program.
SPEC Chauffeur WDK Tool.  Designed to simplify the development of workloads for measuring both energy efficiency and performance.
 PTDaemon. The SPEC PTDaemon software is used to control power analyzers in benchmarks which contain a power measurement component.

Benchmark Search Program 

 SPEC CPUv6, The CPU Search Program seeks to encourage those outside of SPEC to assist them in locating applications that could be used in the next CPU-intensive benchmark suite, currently designated as SPEC CPUv6. Obsoleted now.

Retired Benchmarks (No Successor)

 SPEC SDM91
 SPECsip_infrastructure2011 - the benchmark is still available for purchase but no additional result submissions are being accepted and support is no longer offered.

Retired Benchmarks (No Longer Documented)

 SPECapcSM for Lightwave 3D 9.6, performance evaluation software for systems running NewTek LightWave 3D v9.6 software.
 SPEC 2001
 SPEC CPU89

Portability
SPEC benchmarks are written in a portable programming language (usually C, C#, Java or Fortran), and the interested parties may compile the code using whatever compiler they prefer for their platform, but may not change the code. Manufacturers have been known to optimize their compilers to improve performance of the various SPEC benchmarks.  SPEC has rules that attempt to limit such optimizations.

Licensing
In order to use a benchmark, a license has to be purchased from SPEC; the costs vary from test to test with a typical range from several hundred to several thousand dollars. This pay-for-license model might seem to be in violation of the GPL as the benchmarks include software such as GCC that is licensed by the GPL. However, the GPL does not require software to be distributed for free, only that recipients be allowed to redistribute any GPLed software that they receive; the license agreement for SPEC specifically exempts items that are under "licenses that require free distribution", and the files themselves are placed in a separate part of the overall software package.

References

External links
 
 Official List of SPEC Benchmarks

Computer performance
Evaluation of computers
Companies established in 1988
Companies based in Virginia